Aldomirovtsi is a village in Slivnitsa Municipality, Sofia Province, in western Bulgaria approximately 36 km from Sofia.

Aldomir Ridge in Antarctica is named after the village.

References

See also
 Slivnitsa
 Aldomirovtsi Marsh

Villages in Sofia Province